Sub-Zero is the name of two fictional characters in the Mortal Kombat fighting game franchise by Midway Games and NetherRealm Studios. The warriors from the fictional Lin Kuei clan, the characters are principally defined by their ability to control ice in many forms. Sub-Zero (Bi-Han and Kuai Liang) have appeared in every main installment of the series (excluding Mortal Kombat: Tournament Edition), along with being featured as the protagonist of the action-adventure spin-off Mortal Kombat Mythologies: Sub-Zero (1997).

The franchise's main Sub-Zero is Kuai Liang. Debuting in Mortal Kombat II (1993), he has used the mantle in every chronological game since his introduction. The mantle was previously used in the original 1992 game and Mythologies by his older brother Bi-Han, who appears in subsequent installments as Noob Saibot. In contrast with Bi-Han's anti-heroic and later villainous role in the franchise, the main Sub-Zero is depicted as one of the heroic fighters defending Earthrealm against various threats. Sub-Zero also appears as both a rival and ally of the formerly undead specter Scorpion.

One of Mortal Kombats signature characters, Sub-Zero has appeared in various related media outside of the games. He has received acclaim for his appearance, abilities, and Fatality finishing moves.

Appearances

Mortal Kombat games
Sub-Zero (Bi-Han) appears as a playable character in the original 1992 Mortal Kombat game and the protagonist of the 1997 spin-off/prequel Mortal Kombat Mythologies: Sub-Zero. He was sent by the Chinese ninja clan Lin Kuei to kill the host Shang Tsung. Scorpion held an enmity towards Sub-Zero due to rivalry between their opposing warrior clans (Scorpion's Japanese clan was unnamed). It is revealed that Scorpion was earlier killed by the Sub-Zero, and Scorpion was allowed to return to the physical realms as an undead spectre to take revenge upon Sub-Zero.

In Mortal Kombat II (1993), Sub-Zero (Kuai Liang) is introduced. Upon his brother's death in the first tournament and Shang Tsung's survival, Sub-Zero is sent by the Lin Kuei to enter the Outworld tournament and complete his brother's unfinished task. Scorpion enters the tournament to ensure Sub-Zero's demise. However Scorpion witnesses this Sub-Zero spare an opponent's life; something the original Sub-Zero was not known to do. Scorpion eventually discovers the new Sub-Zero's true identity as the younger brother, in return for taking his older brother's life, vows to protect him forever.

In Mortal Kombat 3 (1995), Sub-Zero and his fellow Lin Kuei clansman Smoke attempt to escape from their clan after they start converting their warriors into cyborgs, but the latter ends up captured and turned into one anyway alongside Sektor and Cyrax; the former of whom was known to usurp Sub-Zero for his own benefit. The three Cyber Lin Kuei ninjas are programmed to hunt and exterminate Sub-Zero, who by this time had received a vision from Raiden and agreed to join a rebellion against a new threat. In addition to the current Sub-Zero, Ultimate Mortal Kombat 3 (1995) and Mortal Kombat Trilogy (1996) include a non-canonical playable character known as "Classic Sub-Zero". His biography states that although he was believed to have died after the first Mortal Kombat tournament, he returned to assassinate Shang Tsung. However, his ending states that he is not Sub-Zero; rather he is an unidentified warrior who was missing from the previous tournament.

In Mortal Kombat 4 (1997), Raiden once again summons Sub-Zero to assist in defending Earthrealm, this time against Shinnok. In the meantime, Sub-Zero fights Scorpion, who Quan Chi has tricked into believing the Lin Kuei warrior killed his family.

In Mortal Kombat: Deadly Alliance (2002), Sub-Zero defeats Sektor in a fight for leadership of the Lin Kuei. He also meets his apprentice Frost and takes her to fight alongside Earthrealm's warriors against the titular alliance of Shang Tsung and Quan Chi.

In Mortal Kombat: Deception (2004), Sub-Zero joins the warrior Shujinko's group to defeat a new threat in the dragon king Onaga as well as confront Noob Saibot. In both Deadly Alliance and Mortal Kombat: Unchained (2006), Sub-Zero battles Frost for the Lin Kuei's leadership and emerges victorious.

In Mortal Kombat: Shaolin Monks (2005), which serves as a retelling of Mortal Kombat II, Sub-Zero first appears as a boss character, but then allies with the protagonists Liu Kang and Kung Lao for a short time during the search for his older brother. He is last seen pursuing Saibot in the Netherrealm. Sub-Zero can also be unlocked as a playable character upon completing the game.

In Mortal Kombat: Armageddons Konquest mode (2007), Sub-Zero faces the warrior Taven, though both eventually decide to ally to stop the invading Saibot and Smoke. After defeating them, Sub-Zero stays with the unconscious Saibot to find a way to save him.

Sub-Zero appears as a playable character in the non-canonical crossover title Mortal Kombat vs. DC Universe (2009), which concerns a war between the eponymous fictional universes. In Sub-Zero's ending, he realizes he is no longer the assassin he once was and leaves the Lin Kuei. Inspired by Batman, he becomes a superhero. Unbeknownst to him, the Lin Kuei are hunting him for deserting them.

Both incarnations of Sub-Zero appear in the 2011 Mortal Kombat reboot game, with the younger assuming the mantle during standard gameplay. The reboot establishes the elder as Bi-Han and the latter as Kuai Liang, while also revealing that Liang used the codename "Tundra" before becoming Sub-Zero. While Bi-Han is still killed by Scorpion and becomes Saibot, Liang's fate changes in the second tournament due to Raiden's interference in an attempt to avert Armageddon. After he defeats Scorpion, Sub-Zero is captured and turned into a cyborg instead of Smoke and forced to serve the otherworldly dimension Outworld and its tyrannical ruler, Shao Kahn. However, he is able to regain his mind and joins Raiden's warriors to stop Shao Kahn. His reunion with Bi-Han as Saibot comes much earlier than it did in the original timeline when he attempts to prevent Quan Chi's Soulnado from forming. After defeating his brother, Sub-Zero is relieved by Native American warrior Nightwolf. However, Shao Kahn's wife, Sindel, electrocutes Sub-Zero before Quan Chi "resurrects" and enslaves him in the Netherrealm as an undead revenant. Sub-Zero's background is further clarified during this installment as well, as it is revealed that the two brothers were in fact abducted by the Lin Kuei as infants after the clan murdered their parents.

In Mortal Kombat X, which takes place two years after the previous game, Sub-Zero continues to serve Quan Chi. It is explained in the tie-in comics that Quan Chi used his magic to recreate his original body to free him of his cyborg body. While serving in Quan Chi's attack on Earthrealm, Sub-Zero and Scorpion are resurrected by Raiden. Over the course of the following twenty-five years, Liang becomes the new grandmaster of the Lin Kuei after defeating Sektor with a computer virus provided by Kung Jin and Bo' Rai Cho; freeing Cyrax and the other cyberized Lin Kuei warriors. He also discovered Quan Chi's role in Bi-Han's downfall and made amends with Scorpion, now Hanzo Hasashi, after revealing Quan Chi and Sektor's involvement in the Shirai Ryu warrior's clan and family's deaths to him. Sub-Zero would later come to the aid of Cassie Cage's team after they are ambushed by Outworld forces while trying to stop Shinnok. While Sub-Zero appears as a playable character in his human form, his cybernetic form is reused as a hidden variation for the DLC character Triborg.

In Mortal Kombat 11, which takes place a further two years after MKX, the keeper of time Kronika brings a past version of Sektor to the present, who kidnaps Sub-Zero's Lin Kuei clansmen to forcibly convert them back into Cyber Lin Kuei and bolster Kronika's forces. In response, Sub-Zero works with Hasashi to infiltrate Sektor's factory and avenge his fallen clansmen, recruiting a time-displaced Cyrax to help them further. Along the way, they encounter Saibot and Frost, the latter whom had abandoned the Lin Kuei over being denied leadership and turned herself into a cyborg after becoming Sektor's second-in-command. Together, Sub-Zero and Hasashi defeat their enemies and force them to retreat before Cyrax shuts down the factory. Due to his Lin Kuei base, among other locations, being compromised by Kronika's allies, Sub-Zero joins his fellow Earthrealm allies at the Shirai Ryu Fire Gardens to assist in formulating a plan to defeat Kronika. At Hasashi's suggestion, he and Sub-Zero head to the Netherrealm to recruit the ferryman Kharon, whom they met while they were revenants. However, Hasashi sends Sub-Zero back to tell Raiden that Kharon will help them while he saves the ferryman from Kronika's minion D'Vorah. When a time-displaced Scorpion arrives bearing news of Hasashi's death by D'Vorah's hand, Sub-Zero initially assumes he is lying and gets into a brief fight with him before realizing the truth with help from Liu Kang. Sub-Zero later takes part in the final battle at Kronika's keep alongside the combined Earthrealm/Outworld armies. In Aftermath expansion storyline, takes place after Scorpion keeps his late-present-self's promise to join Raiden's force, Sub-Zero forgives Scorpion when the latter confirms to have not expected Shang Tsung's presence as well, nor being his ally, and both thought the sorcerer corrupted Fujin, until everything settled down once the Wind God and the sorcerer reveals the truth about the future where they came from, along with their successful preservation of Kronika's crown from falling into Cetrion's hand. In Sub-Zero's non-canonical ending, after defeating Kronika, he considers Bi-Han and his time as Saibot, as well as learning his brother's corruption was caused by Sektor earlier, and forges a new timeline where he is able to reform his brother and fight alongside him once again.

Other games
Sub-Zero has also featured as a guest/cameo character in three non-fighting Midway Games titles: NBA Jam Tournament Edition (1995), The Grid (2000), and MLB Slugfest: Loaded (2004).

Sub-Zero makes a cameo appearance in Injustice: Gods Among Us (2013) during Scorpion's intro, in which the latter is about to perform a fatality on the former before being mysteriously pulled into the Injustice universe.

In the indie-game Punch Club, a ninja named Sub-273 serves as the game's final boss, with his character design based on the first Mortal Kombat film; the "-273" being a reference to the Celsius representation of 0 kelvin, which is considered absolute zero.

Sub-Zero appears as a playable character alongside Raiden via downloadable content in the game's sequel, Injustice 2 (2017). Despite making references to Mortal Kombat vs. DC Universe, Sub-Zero's ending suggests he was also mysteriously pulled to the Injustice universe during the near-end events of Mortal Kombat X. In his arcade ending, following his victory over the alien Brainiac, Sub-Zero worked with Batman to find a way back to his universe. In the meantime, the former became a teacher to the latter's younger allies, while waiting for the gate to his home Mortal Kombat universe prepared. After the tyrannical Superman is accidentally freed from the Phantom Zone when the gate to Mortal Kombat dimension gone awry however, a duty-bound Sub-Zero chooses to stay for as long as he needs to so he can assist the Justice League in re-imprisoning him.

Character design and gameplay

Sub-Zero has Ice powers and was first conceived by Mortal Kombat co-creator John Tobias as a mysterious character named simply "Ninja". According to Richard Divizio, the Lin Kuei idea was his input back at the very beginning of the development, in the project that had been cancelled by Midway Games before being restarted later, and in which "originally John [Tobias] had Japanese ninjas". Tobias wrote this inspiration came from the controversial book China's Ninja Connection by Li Hsing, which "posits historical evidence for the existence of the Lin Kuei and their influence on the Japanese ninja. I was aware of there being some controversy about the author’s claims. So when we split the character in two for palette swaps, I thought it would be fitting that one was of Chinese origin and the other Japanese to kind of embody the argument." According to Tobias, the original "Hunter&Hunted concept was going [to be] about a ninja escaping from his clan and hunted by another member. We used that later for SZ in MK3." Daniel Pesina recalled Tobias' idea involved two ninja brothers, one of whom "wants to lead the clan, so he kills the father who is their teacher". Sub-Zero's early name had been Tundra, but it was changed after a member of the design team saw the 1987 film The Running Man in which the first assassin fought by Arnold Schwarzenegger's character used the name (albeit not hyphenated).

Sub-Zero have primarily been portrayed or voiced by non-Asian actors. Midway Games later explained Sub-Zero's rather occidental appearance for a Chinese assassin by giving him a white mother. According to this new backstory, his father had a wife, two sons, and a daughter while he lived in America to hide his personal role as an assassin for the Lin Kuei. Sub-Zero was originally portrayed by Daniel Pesina, who also first came up with the Lin Kuei idea. At first, Pesina was using a cheap store-bought ninja costume, purchased by him because of budget reasons, that was a size too small and thus caused problems during the filming session. Midway Games programmer Josh Tsui portrayed the unmasked Sub-Zero (Kuai Liang) in the character's Mortal Kombat II ending.

Sub-Zero's early costumes have been very simple due to technical limitations. Mortal Kombat co-creator Ed Boon noted that Kuai Liang's counterpart from DC Comics is Batman as both are "dark, mysterious, brooding characters". Tobias said that Sub-Zero was unmasked in Mortal Kombat 3 in order to stir up fan speculation about the character's backstory. The new Sub-Zero made his official debut on the cover of GamePro April 1995 issue, with Turk's red outfit tinted blue (as it was for the game), but the photo used was a reversed negative, as his scar was over his left eye. Since Mortal Kombat 3, Sub-Zero has had a scar running down from his forehead and across his right eye as a mark of death. The scar was originally red, and later changed to blue in Mortal Kombat: Deadly Alliance as a result of Sub-Zero's enhanced powers. Mortal Kombat and Deadly Alliance states that Sub-Zero is 6 feet 2 inches tall; in recent games such as Mortal Kombat X and Mortal Kombat 11, his sprite appears to be similar to most characters. In Mortal Kombat: Deception, his scar has faded to the point where it can no longer be seen. He now wore an armored uniform heavily inspired by Dynastic era Chinese battle armor, though it was often criticized by fans as being too reminiscent of Teenage Mutant Ninja Turtles villain, the Shredder. However, Sub-Zero's alternate uniform was very reminiscent of Chinese culture, even featuring Sub-Zero without a cowl and a Qing dynasty-era hairstyle. In Mortal Kombat: Armageddon, Sub-Zero reverts to his masked costume from Deadly Alliance, retaining the scar, which is not part of his alternate costume (which is the primary one from Deception). Since Deadly Alliance, Sub-Zero is the only character who has shown considerable signs of aging. Concept art from Deadly Alliance depicted him with a graying, receding hairline, and a more pale and gaunt face, while his scar was now blue and his forearms frozen over. Although Sub-Zero originally had blue eyes, they turned white after he obtained the Dragon Medallion in the game. Sub-Zero's appearance in Mortal Kombat: Shaolin Monks was one of the most revised ones from the title. Character lead Mark Lappin did almost ten passes on his design; producer Shaun Himmerick noted that "we went through literally 5-6 heads and styles of head costume on him" and commented that Sub-Zero's design in Mortal Kombat was difficult to make although most people called it "simple". In the end, the staff was satisfied with his final look in the game as it reminisces them to his classic outfit. His appearance in Injustice 2 was redesigned by Jim Lee.

When he first appeared in the first Mortal Kombat, Sub-Zero featured only two special moves: his ice blast and sliding kick. These moves have become Sub-Zero's trademark since then, being featured in every game that Sub-Zero has appeared in (Mortal Kombat II and subsequent games feature the second Sub-Zero named Kuai Liang). Mortal Kombat II added his ground freeze move, and two new Fatalities including the now-famous one where he would freeze and shatter the victim. According to Boon, Sub-Zero's Freeze was originally omitted from the game in place of the Ice Shower, but was brought back in the next revision following fan feedback at a local arcade. Sub-Zero's Predator-inspired Fatality, the "Spine Rip," is considered by Boon to be his favorite Fatality from the first game as well as the most controversial. Some home versions of the first game replaced the "Spine Rip" with another finishing move due to its violent content, for instance the SNES port had a freeze and shatter finishing move due to Nintendo's "family friendly" policies. Unlike other returning characters whose moves remained intact, the spine rip Fatality was not carried over to Mortal Kombat II and Mortal Kombat 3, (an explanation is because Kuai Liang was heroic compared to his villainous brother Bi-Han) but was brought back in Ultimate Mortal Kombat 3 as one of Classic Sub-Zero's finishers. However, the move was intentionally censored by Midway; right after he grabbed onto his opponent, the screen went black and only the resulting sound effects were heard. This was due to the development team choosing not to animate the spine rip fatality for each of the updated character sprites in the game. The Nintendo 64 port of Mortal Kombat Trilogy gives all of the  Sub-Zero's (Kuai Liang) special techniques and finishing moves to the classic masked version, due to the fact the N64's cartridge format had memory restrictions that did not allow the use of both masked and unmasked characters. The developers had to remove the "Spine Rip" from Mortal Kombat vs. DC Universe as that game was aimed at a younger audience. Sub-Zero also gained a teleporting move in the game in which he freezes himself and falls back to the ground, appearing behind the foe.

Sub-Zero (Bi-Han and Kuai Liang) have appeared as playable in every iteration of the primary fighting game series. Mortal Kombat: Tournament Edition, one of the two Game Boy Advance ports of Deadly Alliance, is the franchise's only fighting game not to feature him as a playable character. The action-adventure spin-off Mortal Kombat: Special Forces is the only game entirely without Sub-Zero.

Other media

The Mortal Kombat 3 version of the Sub-Zero (Kuai Liang) made a cameo appearance in the epilogue of Malibu Comics' 1995 Mortal Kombat: Battlewave miniseries, in which he froze a group of Lin Kuei while proclaiming that the clan was corrupted and no longer worthy of his services. This subplot was never developed as the Mortal Kombat comic book series folded shortly thereafter.

Sub-Zero (Bi-Han) appears in the Mortal Kombat: Blood & Thunder comic series.

François Petit portrays the Sub-Zero (Bi-Han) in first Mortal Kombat film. In the film, Sub Zero is mind controlled slave to Shang Tsung and faces off against Liu Kang in the Tournament. In the fight, he forms an invincible ice shield. With advice from Kitana, Liu uses water to form a spear that kills Sub Zero.  Set in the same continuity as the 95 film, Sub-Zero (Bi-Han), appears in the animated film Mortal Kombat: The Journey Begins voiced by Jim Cummings.

Ryan Watson portrayed the Sub-Zero (Kuai Liang) in the 1996 theatrical show Mortal Kombat: Live Tour.

Sub-Zero (Kuai Liang) is one of the leading characters in the animated series Mortal Kombat: Defenders of the Realm, where he is voiced by Luke Perry. There, Sub-Zero is a member of a good group of warriors assembled by Raiden to defend Earthrealm from invaders who entered through portals from various other dimensions, alongside Jax, Kitana, Liu Kang, Nightwolf, Sonya and Stryker.

Sub-Zero (Kuai Liang) made an appearance in Mortal Kombat: Annihilation, where he was portrayed by Keith Cooke, who had played Reptile in the first movie. After saving both Liu Kang and Kitana from an ambush by Smoke, Sub-Zero has an inconclusive fight with Scorpion, who kidnaps Kitana and escapes. He urges Liu Kang to seek out Nightwolf, as instructed by Raiden, before going after Kitana, then leaves Liu Kang to continue on his quest.

An ancestor of the Sub-Zero (Kuai Liang) is featured in two episodes of the live-action series Mortal Kombat: Conquest, and was played by J. J. Perry. He was a Lin Kuei assassin hired by Shang Tsung to defeat Great Kung Lao and retrieve a magic crystal from his home, which had the ability to transport its keeper to other dimensions. Sub-Zero's rivalry with Scorpion was also featured, in which Scorpion murdered Sub-Zero's sister and Sub-Zero killed Scorpion's lover in retaliation. The two fought to a draw and Scorpion escaped when Kung Lao and his friends came to Sub-Zero's aid. Sub-Zero was subsequently berated by the Lin Kuei for his weakness, resulting in him killing the Grandmaster.

Sub-Zero (Bi-Han) appears in the seventh episode of the live-action series Mortal Kombat: Legacy portrayed by Kevan Ohtsji, assassinating a shogun whom Hanzo Hasashi was supposed to protect and fought against him at the end of part one. In the next episode it is revealed that Quan Chi impersonated him in order to deceive Scorpion into believing that Sub-Zero murdered his family and clan to enact a false sense of vengeance in him against Bi-Han and gain his allegiance for the upcoming Mortal Kombat tournament. In season two of Legacy, Eric Steinberg portrayed Bi-Han while his brother Kuai Liang was played by Harry Shum. The relationship between Bi-Han and Hanzo is further explored, as they were childhood friends driven apart by the existing rivalry between their two clans, as well as the jealousy of Kuai Liang. When they become adults, Kuai Liang threatens Hanzo and his family while out for a walk and Hanzo is forced to kill Kuai Liang. Bi-Han, believing Hanzo was protecting his family, decides to end the feud between their two clans out of respect for his friend. He becomes saddened and enraged by the fact that his clan had supposedly killed Hanzo, his family, and his clan. He then discovers that Quan Chi had impersonated him. Having been chosen to fight for Earthrealm in Mortal Kombat, he encounters Hanzo on the battlefield. Bi-Han's efforts to explain himself to Hanzo are fruitless, as Hanzo is now an undead specter only responding to the name Scorpion, who then kills Bi-Han by ripping out his spine.

He plays a supporting role in several issues of DC Comics' 2015 Mortal Kombat X: Blood Ties comic miniseries that is set before the events of the game.

In Mortal Kombat Legends: Scorpion's Revenge (2020), Sub-Zero (Bi-Han) is initially depicted as the ruthless killer of Scorpion's wife and son. He is killed by Scorpion during the Mortal Kombat tournament on Shang Tsung's island. At the end of the movie it is revealed that Quan Chi impersonated the original Sub-Zero through sorcery, convinced the Lin Kuei clan to assault the Shirai Ryu, and killed Scorpion's wife and son in order to manipulate Scorpion into becoming his champion.

Sub-Zero (Bi-Han) is the main villain of the 2021 Mortal Kombat reboot film, and is played by Joe Taslim. Bi-Han and the Lin Kuei serve Outworld willingly, and he personally attacks and kills Hanzo Hasashi's family, while he is additionally responsible for the destruction of Jax's arms. At the end of the film, Sub-Zero is cornered by the specter Scorpion and new hero/descendant Cole Young and burned alive before his body is claimed by Shang Tsung.

Kuai Liang appears in the 2021 animated film Mortal Kombat Legends: Battle of the Realms voiced by Bayardo De Murguia. He returns in the 2022 sequel Mortal Kombat Legends: Snow Blind and was voiced by Ron Yuan.

Merchandise and promotion
Merchandise items of the character include action figures, statues, and a joystick released along with Mortal Kombat: Deception for the PlayStation 2.

Reception
Deemed as one of the most popular and recognizable characters in the Mortal Kombat franchise, as well as in the fighting-genre as a whole, Sub-Zero is regarded as the franchise's most iconic character along with Scorpion. He was given the award of the best fighter of 1997 by SuperGamePower (readers vote). His redesign in Mortal Kombat 3 was disliked by GamePro, which they deemed "suspenders" and compared his scar to a red smear. However, his appearance in Deadly Alliance received praise by Gaming Age's Tim Lewinson noting that "Sub-Zero never looked so good." GameDaily listed his appearance in Mortal Kombat Mythologies: Sub-Zero as one of his worst moments. On the other hand, IGN staff liked how Sub-Zero was given his own video game, noting him to be one of the series' most popular characters, and that "it offers gamers a new look at Sub Zero." A GamesRadar article from 2011 discussed his and Scorpion's evolution across the Mortal Kombat series, citing them as its two most popular characters. The rivalry between Sub-Zero and Batman in Mortal Kombat vs. DC Universe was emphasized by IGN who noted that although both characters were extremely powerful, Sub-Zero's freezing skills were more entertaining than Batman's abilities. Den of Geek listed the first Sub-Zero as the eighth best Mortal Kombat character, praising his role in Mythologies Sub-Zero whereas the second Sub-Zero was listed as the top Mortal Kombat based on many of his actions such as his rivalry with Batman, as well as his role in the series such as his relationship with the Lin Kuei. Conversely, Hyper's John Dewhurst opined that what contributed to the failure of Mythologies Sub-Zero is that Sub-Zero's character alone "isn't that interesting without Johnny Cage and Kitana to bounce off."

In 2010, UGO ranked Sub-Zero ninth on their top list of Mortal Kombat characters, noting his ninja costume as the most iconic from the series. That same year, GamePlayBook ranked him as the best Mortal Kombat character, praising his freeze attacks and "Head Rip" Fatality, but the unmasked version of Sub-Zero was ranked as the third worst Mortal Kombat character. In 2011, ScrewAttack ranked Sub-Zero second in their Top 10 list of Mortal Kombat "kharacters" while Anthony Severino of Game Revolution tied him with Scorpion at the top of their list of the best "old school" Mortal Kombat fighters, noting both of them as the most popular characters from the franchise. In 2012, Sub-Zero placed third in UGO's list of top Mortal Kombat characters. That same year, IGN's Brian Altano and Ryan Clements chose him as the most iconic character of Mortal Kombat to represent the series against Jin Kazama of Tekken and Ryu of Street Fighter.

IGN included Sub-Zero's first incarnation at 85th place in their list of 100 video game villains. He made it to the semifinals of GamesRadar's 2008 "Ultimate Character Battle!" poll, losing to Hulk. In 2009, GameSpy named him one of the 25 "extremely rough brawlers" in gaming, praising his fighting style. Complex ranked Sub-Zero as the fifth "most dominant" fighting game character in 2012, as well as the 24th "most badass" video game character of all time in 2013. The readers of Dorkly voted him the series' fourth (the elder Sub-Zero) and second (the younger) greatest character in a 2013 poll. Together, Scorpion and Sub-Zero were voted the fifth most iconic characters in the two decades of the PlayStation by readers of PlayStation Official Magazine – UK in 2015. Sub-Zero alone, ahead of Scorpion, placed third in a 2016 readers poll by Hobby Consolas for the most popular character in all fighting games.

Sub-Zero was featured on numerous lists of the best video game ninja characters, including in these by CrunchGear (at number ten) in 2008, by Unreality (at number four) in 2009, and ScrewAttack (at number five) in 2010. Scorpion and Sub-zero shared the fifth place on the top video game ninja list by PC World in 2009 Virgin Media too featured him on their list of "top ten ninjas", while GamesRadar featured him in their 2008 article discussing the top video game assassins, stating that "his bloody ways and ability to freeze opponents solid enabled him to punch his way into the hearts of arcade gamers everywhere." In 2012, BBC News mentioned Sub-Zero as a prominent example of "Western ninja-inspired nonsense" in popular culture.

His ice-projectile technique has been noted by 1UP.com to be one of the best mechanics that changed video games due to how practical it is as it gives players the opportunity of making any move while the opponent is frozen. Prima Games listed the same move as the 23rd in fighting games due to how it paralyses enemies, allowing the player to attack the enemy. Additionally, the same site ranked his "Spinal Rip Fatality" 12th due to how Sub-Zero holds the enemy's head after decapitating him. According to GameSpot's Jeff Gerstmann, the unlocking of the hidden character Classic Sub-Zero in Ultimate Mortal Kombat 3 was "annoying" to the point that players would not do it. In 2010, ScrewAttack ranked Sub-Zero's original Fatality as the best in the series and credited its infamy with the creation of the ESRB video game ratings system.

See also

Ninjas in popular culture

References

External links

Action film characters
Cyborg characters in video games
Fictional Chinese people in video games
Fictional Lóng Xíng Mó Qiáo practitioners
Fictional characters with post-traumatic stress disorder
Fictional male martial artists
Fictional martial artists in video games
Fictional polearm and spearfighters
Fictional shotokan practitioners
Fictional swordfighters in video games
Male characters in video games
Mortal Kombat characters
Ninja characters in video games
Video game characters introduced in 1992
Video game characters who can teleport
Video game characters with ice or cold abilities
Video game protagonists